This is a list of Monuments of National Importance (ASI) as officially recognized by and available through the website of the Archaeological Survey of India in the Indian state Tripura. The monument identifier is a combination of the abbreviation of the subdivision of the list (state, ASI circle) and the numbering as published on the website of the ASI. 8 Monuments of National Importance have been recognized by the ASI in Tripura.

List of monuments of national importance 

|}

See also 
 List of Monuments of National Importance in India
 List of State Protected Monuments in Tripura

References 

Tripura
Monuments of National Importance
Monuments of National Importance